A House Full of Love is a 1954 Austrian-West German romantic comedy film directed by Hans Schweikart and starring Gertrud Kückelmann, Michael Cramer and Erni Mangold. It was shot at the Sievering Studios in Vienna. The film's sets were designed by the art director Fritz Jüptner-Jonstorff.

Cast
 Gertrud Kückelmann as Mady
 Michael Cramer as Paul
 Erni Mangold
 Irene Naef as Sybille
 Wilfried Seyferth as Remming
 Peer Schmidt as Billy
 Gunnar Möller as Lutz
 Jane Tilden as Lydia
 Marianne Stopp
 Franz Böheim
 Ulrich Bettac
 Beppo Brem
 Michl Lang
 Rudolf Vogel
 Ernst Waldbrunn
 Hanni Schall

References

Bibliography

External links 
 

1954 films
1954 romantic comedy films
Austrian romantic comedy films
German romantic comedy films
West German films
1950s German-language films
Films directed by Hans Schweikart
German films based on plays
German black-and-white films
1950s German films
Films shot at Sievering Studios